Timothy Smith (born July 2, 1982) is an American professional basketball player who plays the point guard position. Smith played collegiately at East Tennessee State University (ETSU) from 2002–03 to 2005–06 before becoming a professional.

Basketball career

College
When Tim Smith entered college in 2002, ETSU was still a member of the Southern Conference. As a freshman in 2002–03 he recorded 475 points, 114 assists and 73 steals. He was named the Southern Conference Freshman of the Year while guiding ETSU as runners-up in the conference's North Division. The Buccaneers also won the 2003 Southern Conference Tournament and earned an automatic berth into the NCAA Tournament, but lost to Wake Forest, 76 to 73, in the first round.

As a sophomore in 2003–04, Smith once again led ETSU to a successful season. He reached the career 1,000-point mark after finishing the year with 565 points, and he also recorded 145 assists and 82 steals. ETSU were Southern Conference regular season and tournament champions, but once again lost in the NCAA Tournament's first round by three points. Cincinnati defeated the Buccaneers, 80 to 77. For the second consecutive season, however, Smith was named to the Southern Conference All-Tournament First Team. He also led the team in scoring at 17.7 points per game and was named a First Team All-Conference honoree.

In 2004–05, Smith's junior year, he repeated as a Southern Conference First Team selection after recording 645 points, 123 assists and 62 steals. The Buccaneers struggled despite his 22.2 points per game average and only finished with a 10–19 overall record.

East Tennessee State University moved to the Atlantic Sun Conference between his junior and senior seasons. As a senior in 2005–06, Smith solidified his name in both the ETSU and NCAA record books. In 28 games he recorded 95 steals, good for a 3.39 steals per game average that led NCAA Division I. His 22.0 points per game average led ETSU for a third straight season, and his 615 points scored that season brought his career total to exactly 2,300, the most in school history. Smith's 313 career steals is second in ETSU history to Keith Jennings' 334. Smith was honored as the Atlantic Sun Conference Men's Basketball Player of the Year in 2006 as well.

Professional
Smith did not get selected in the 2006 NBA Draft so he took his game abroad to play professionally. In his first season, he played for ETHA Engomis in Cyprus Basketball Division 1. He started all 10 games that he played in, but was then waived and signed with Al Jeish Army in Syria. However, he never appeared in a game for this club. The following year (2007–08) Smith signed with Gothia Basket in the Swedish Basketball League. In 11 games played, all of which he started, he averaged 17.9 points, 3.3 assists and 1.9 steals per game.

His best season in his relatively young professional career, however, occurred in 2008–09 as a member of Ciudad de Vigo Básquet in Spain's Liga Española de Baloncesto. Smith started all 30 games, averaged 15.5 points, 3.9 assists and 1.7 steals en route to being named to the Eurobasket.com Spanish LEB Silver All-Defensive Team. He helped the team move up to the LEB Gold Division for the 2009–10, of which he played for them again. Smith signed a contract to play for BSC Raiffeisen Panthers Fürstenfeld in Austria for the 2010–11 season.

See also
List of NCAA Division I men's basketball season steals leaders

References

External links
ETSU athletic bio

1982 births
Living people
American expatriate basketball people in Austria
American expatriate basketball people in Cyprus
American expatriate basketball people in Spain
American expatriate basketball people in Sweden
American men's basketball players
Basketball players from Virginia
Ciudad de Vigo Básquet players
East Tennessee State Buccaneers men's basketball players
Hargrave Military Academy alumni
Point guards
Sportspeople from Newport News, Virginia